Thomas Scullion (1939 – 12 February 2021) was an Irish Gaelic footballer, manager and administrator. Regarded as a "legend of club and county", he won Ulster Championships with the Derry senior football team as both a player and manager. Scullion has also been described as Derry's most decorated club player of all time, having won the All-Ireland Club Championship and 12 Derry County Championship titles with Bellaghy.

Honours

Player
Queen's University Belfast
Sigerson Cup; 1958

Bellaghy
All-Ireland Senior Club Football Championship: 1971-72
Ulster Senior Club Football Championship: 1968, 1971
Derry Senior Football Championship: 1956, 1958, 1959, 1960, 1961, 1963, 1964, 1965, 1968, 1969, 1971, 1972

Derry
Ulster Senior Football Championship: 1958

Manager
Derry
Ulster Senior Football Championship: 1987

References

1939 births
2021 deaths
Bellaghy Gaelic footballers
Derry inter-county Gaelic footballers
Gaelic football managers
Gaelic games administrators
Date of birth missing